Wayamba United was a franchise cricket team that took part in Sri Lanka Premier League, representing North Western Province. Wadhawan Holdings Private Limited purchased the team for $5.02 million in 2012 for a seven-year contract.

History

Wayamba cricket team was a Sri Lankan first class cricket team based in Kurunegala, that represented North Western Province. It drew cricketers from Sri Lanka Premier Trophy. The team competed in two provincial tournaments: the first class cricket competition known as the Inter-Provincial Tournament, and the Twenty20 competition known as the Inter-Provincial Twenty20. Also Wayamba province cricket team became joint champions with Kandurata in the 2007/08 Inter-Provincial Limited overs tournament after the finals match drawn due to rain.

The Wayamba cricket team featured in both the 2009 and 2010 editions of the Champions League Twenty20 as the Wayamba elevens.

Home ground

Welagedara Stadium is a multi-use stadium in Kurunegala, in the North Western Province of Sri Lanka, which is situated about 100 km north east of Kandy. The stadium is currently used mostly for cricket matches and is the home ground of Wayamba cricket team. The stadium can hold at least 10,000 spectators. Since its wicket had been replaced from a matting wicket to a turf one it has become one of the best batting wickets in the country. It was officially declared open by the then Minister of Home Affairs, Justice Felix Dias Bandaranaike in 1972. Welagedara stadium hosted its first international match when Pakistan played there in 1985. In recent times it has regularly hosted international tour matches, unofficial test matches and U19 one-day games. The ground is an extremely picturesque one, with the giant 'Elephant Rock' forming a dramatic back-drop to the ground. It also has historic value being situated in an important location for when Kurunegala was an important Kingdom, King Bhuvanaikabahu VI, would address his subjects from the press box beneath the Elephant Rock. Even though it has a lot of amenities, the Welagedara Stadium is not going to be used for the 2012 SLPL tournament.

Current squad 

Coach: Trevor Bayliss was named as the head of the franchise for the 2012 edition of the SLPL.

Players with international caps are listed in bold.

References

External links
Team site on ESPN CricInfo
Team site on Sri Lanka Premier League

Sri Lanka Premier League teams
Sports clubs in Sri Lanka
Cricket clubs established in 2012
Cricket clubs disestablished in 2012
2012 establishments in Sri Lanka
Cricket in Kurunegala
Sport in Kurunegala